The women's high jump at the 2013 Southeast Asian Games, the athletics was held in Naypyidaw, Myanmar. The track and field events took place at the Wunna Theikdi Stadiumon December 19.

Schedule
All times are Myanmar Standard Time (UTC+06:30)

Records

Results 
Legend
NM — No Mark
DNS — Did Not Start

References

Athletics at the 2013 Southeast Asian Games
2013 in women's athletics